Mylari Ramiah Chandru (born 7 February 1980) is an Indian film writer, director and producer who works primarily in Kannada cinema. He is most Known for the 2008 film Taj Mahal.

Early life 
R Chandrashekar was born to M Ramaiah and Lakshmi Devamma in Keshavavara, Chikkaballapur. He developed the art of writing from his early childhood and also published a few of his stories on Kannada news papers. His early adulthood was mostly spent helping his father in agriculture.

Career 
R Chandru started his film career as an assistant to director S. Narayan for a serial Bhageerathi. In the year 2008, Chandru made his debut as a director and writer in the 'Taj Mahal' Starring Ajay Rao and Pooja Gandhi. Followed by 2009 movie Prem Kahani. in the year 2010 he directed one of the blockbuster Kannada cinema Mylari starring Shivrajkumar and Sadha.

Most of his films are musical entertainers. Likewise he directed and produced one of the famous movies of Kannada Film Industry Charminar in the year 2013.

After achieving considerable success in the industry, Chandru has opened a production house under the banner 'Sri Sideshwara enterprises' with an intention of helping budding talents.

Chandru is directing mass action entertainer Kabzaa which will be released in 2024. The movie is made with the budget of over 100 crores. The film will be released in Kannada, Hindi, Telugu, Tamil, Malayalam, Marathi and Bengali. The movie stars Upendra and Sudeep in the lead roles, while Shriya Saran plays the female lead. The music for this film has been composed by Ravi Basrur.

Filmography

Awards and nominations 

 Won the Best Director and Best Producer award for the movie Charminar at Karnataka State Awards.

References

External links

Living people
Kannada film directors
21st-century Indian film directors
Indian male screenwriters
Indian lyricists
People from Chikkaballapur district
Film directors from Karnataka
1980 births